Blatch is a surname. Notable people with the surname include:

Emily Blatch, Baroness Blatch (1937–2005), British politician
Harriot Stanton Blatch (1856–1940), American writer and suffragist
Helen Blatch (1933–2015), British actress, mostly seen on television
Nora Stanton Blatch Barney (1883–1971), American civil engineer, architect, and suffragist
Peter Blatch (born 1953)
William Gabriel Blatch (1840–1900), British entomologist